The Association for Applied Psychophysiology and Biofeedback (AAPB) was founded in 1969 as the Biofeedback Research Society (BRS). The association aims to promote understanding of biofeedback and advance the methods used in this practice. AAPB is a non-profit organization as defined in Section 501(c)(6) of the Internal Revenue Service Code.

Aims
AAPB aims to advance the development, dissemination and utilization of knowledge about applied psychophysiology and biofeedback to improve health and the quality of life through research, education and practice.

AAPB's aims include:
 the encouragement of scientific research and the expansion of clinical and educational applications of biofeedback and applied psychophysiology,
 the integration of biofeedback with other self-regulatory methods,
 the promotion of high standards of professional practice, ethics, and education,
 the increase of member knowledge through events, publications, educational programs, and special interest sections and divisions,
 making the public aware of biofeedback.

Definition of biofeedback
The American Psychological Association has named biofeedback as a clinical proficiency.

The Association for Applied Psychophysiology and Biofeedback (AAPB), the Biofeedback Certification Institution of America (BCIA), and the International Society for Neurofeedback and Research (ISNR) approved the following definition of biofeedback on May 18, 2008:

Journals

Applied Psychophysiology and Biofeedback
Applied Psychophysiology and Biofeedback is a journal devoted to study of the interrelationship of physiological systems, cognition, social and environmental parameters, and health. Priority is given to original research which contributes to the theory, practice, and evaluation of applied psychophysiology and biofeedback. Other sections are for conceptual and theoretical articles; evaluative reviews; the Clinical Forum, which includes case studies, clinical replication series, treatment protocols, and clinical notes and observations; the Discussion Forum; innovations in instrumentation; letters to the editor, comments on issues raised in articles; and book reviews. Applied Psychophysiology and Biofeedback is a publication of the Association for Applied Psychophysiology and Biofeedback. Frank Andrasik serves as the journal's editor.

Biofeedback: A Clinical Journal
Biofeedback: A Clinical Journal is a peer-reviewed, quarterly online journal for biofeedback practitioners, educators, health and mental health professionals, and researchers in psychophysiology. Biofeedback includes reports on advances in biofeedback, neurofeedback, self-regulation strategies, sports physiology, personal and occupational wellness, peak performance in the arts, and scientific psychophysiology.

Biofeedback also publishes articles on practice standards and ethical principles in research and practice, feature articles on  uses of biofeedback, and case studies illustrating use of mind-body therapies and principles. Priority is given to programs of research, innovative clinical programs, and technical advances. The journal also publishes historical and biographical articles on biofeedback and psychophysiology; reviews of the development of biofeedback in international settings; innovations in instrumentation and software; and book reviews. Biofeedback: A Clinical Journal is an official publication of the Association for Applied Psychophysiology and Biofeedback. Don Moss serves as the journal's editor.

Teleseminar Series
 AAPB Teleseminars present findings in topics of interest to biofeedback and neurofeedback professionals like Battle Trauma and Neurons and Neurotransmitters. Teleseminars are approved by the APA and Nursing Association, and  most last 90 minutes, providing 1.5 hours of CE Credit. Telesminars allow professionals to earn all of the CE credits needed for professional licensure and BCIA renewal.

Membership
Membership in AAPB is open to professionals interested in the investigation and application of applied psychophysiology and biofeedback, and in the scientific and professional advancement of the field. The AAPB has grown to more than 2,000 members representing the fields of psychology, medicine, nursing, social work, counseling, physical therapy, education, and other health care areas. Corporations can support AAPB through their Corporate Membership. There are many state chapters, and the association has members in several countries.

Structure

Allied Professionals Section
The Applied Professionals Section was formed to create an alliance of biofeedback professionals in order to support recognition of unlicensed biofeedback practitioners. Members include biofeedback professionals who are researchers, rehabilitation specialists, educators, stress management counselors, health care specialists, and other biofeedback consultants who are not recognized under a specific license. The Allied Professionals Section accepts unlicensed biofeedback practitioners, regardless of their specialty (EMG, EEG or general).

Applied Respiratory Psychophysiology Section
The Applied Respiratory Psychophysiology Section promotes scientific and clinical activities in the area of respiratory retraining for treating psychological and physical symptoms, and the management of respiratory diseases. The section fosters research on the causes and effects of hyperventilation and effects of respiratory rhythms on other physiological systems including the body's homeostatic reflexes.

Education Section
The Education Section is the oldest within AAPB. The section focuses on assisting biofeedback professionals as educators and supporting applications of biofeedback in an educational setting.

The section embarked on a project in 2008 to redefine its mission and function within AAPB. Included in the section's proposed initiatives is the development of a web-based “link” that will enable the exchange of information between AAPB's stakeholders. The first phase of implementation for the link project is planned as a component of AAPB's larger website renovation, and will involve coordinating information about planned educational programs amongst AAPB and its state, regional, and international chapters.

International Section
The International Section fosters the promotion of scientific research and clinical practice; promotion of high standards of professional practice, peer review, ethics, and education in biofeedback; and dissemination of information about biofeedback to members and the public. Members can be involved in the governance of the section, develop a network of international contacts dealing with similar issues, clarify how AAPB and the section can better meet their needs, and can contribute to the expansion of biofeedback worldwide.

ISMA - USA Stress Management Section
The purpose of the ISMA-USA Stress Management Section is to promote scientific and clinical activities in the application areas of stress management for treating psychological and physical symptoms and management of stress-related disorders.

Mind-Body Medicine Section
Mind-body medicine is an area of research funding by the NIH’s National Center for Complementary and Alternative Medicine (NCCAM) and the Office of Behavioral and Social Sciences Research (OBSSR). The website is at [https://www.aapb.org The goal is to increase participation in AAPB by creative thinkers, teachers, researchers and explorers in meditation, distant healing, prayer, hypnosis and imagery, yoga, intuition and dreams, psychoacoustics, qigong, and related areas.

Neurofeedback Division
Neurofeedback Division membership is open to members of AAPB who are interested in research and practice in neurofeedback (EEG biofeedback). The division sponsors activities at the AAPB Annual Meeting, including key speakers and workshops. The Neurofeedback Division Newsletter includes articles on clinical and technical interviews, topics including insurance, ethics, medicolegal issues, and products, systems, and approaches. Articles for the Biofeedback Newsmagazine are also submitted by division members.

Benefits of membership include newsletters and list servs, programs and a dinner at the annual meeting, web-listing opportunities, and access to the AAPB website's member's only area. Sustaining Members receive recognition in the Neurofeedback Newsletter, certificate showing support of Division, and free web link in Member's Only Section of website.

Optimal Functioning Section
The Optimal Functioning Section was organized to discuss and explore uses of biofeedback and applied psychophysiology for optimizing health, mental, physical, emotional and spiritual functioning, and peak performance fields. The section holds a meeting in conjunction with the annual conference, and sponsors invite symposia and presentations from recognized experts.

Performing Arts Psychophysiology Section
The Performing Arts Psychophysiology Section is open to anyone interested in psychophysiology for artists. Members possess a background in art. The section was founded on the premise that the physiological effects of stress threaten artists' health and professional careers. It encourages development of clinical applications, validation of therapies which artists utilize, and testing of arts populations with psychophysiological models.

sEMG/SESNA Division
The Surface EMG Division within AAPB began as the Surface EMG Society of North America (SESNA). The aim is to promote the use of surface electromyography techniques within the context of applied psychophysiology. They provide a track at the AAPB Annual Meeting, workshops, and internet dialogue on members’ interests.

State, Regional, and International Chapters

State Chapters
 Biofeedback Society of California
 Colorado Association for Applied Psychophysiology and Biofeedback
 Biofeedback Society of Florida
 Biofeedback Society of Georgia
 Biofeedback Society of Illinois
 Michigan Society for Behavioral Medicine and Biofeedback
 Biofeedback Society of New Mexico
 Biofeedback Society of North Carolina
 Pennsylvania for Behavioral Medicine & Biofeedback
 Biofeedback Society of Texas
 Biofeedback Society of Washington
 Biofeedback Society of Wisconsin

Regional Chapters
 Mid-Atlantic Society for Biofeedback and Behavioral Medicine
 Northeast Regional Biofeedback Society

International Chapters
 Polish Biofeedback and Applied Psychophysiology Society

History
The Biofeedback Research Society (BRS) was founded in 1969. The BRS was renamed the Biofeedback Society of America (BSA) in 1976 and the Association for Applied Psychophysiology and Biofeedback (AAPB) in 1989.

Executive Directors
1969 to 2009 - Francine Butler, PhD, CAE, CMP
2007 to 2010 - David L. Stumph, IOM, CAE

Past presidents
2008 - Aubrey Ewing
2007 - Alan Glaros
2006 - Richard Gevirtz
2005 - Richard Sherman
2004 - Steve Baskin
2003 - Lynda Kirk
2002 - Paul Lehrer
2001 - Donald Moss
2000 - Doil Montgomery
1999 - Dale Walters
1998 - Ian Wickramasekera
1997 - Sebastian Striefel
1996 - Joel F. Lubar
1995 - Angele McGrady
1994 - Michael McKee
1993 - Frank Andrasik
1992 - Paula B. Amar
1991 - Steven L. Wolf
1990 - J. Peter Rosenfeld
1989 - Susan Middaugh
1988 - M. Barry Sterman
1987 - Mark Schwartz
1986 - Carol Schneider
1985 - Patricia Norris
1984 - Neal Miller
1983 - John D. Rugh
1982 - Steven L. Fahrion
1981 - Bernard T. Engel
1980 - Edward Taub
1979 - John Basmajian
1978 - Elmer Green
1977 - Charles Stroebel
1976 - Erik Peper
1975 - Joe Kamiya
1974 - Thomas H. Budzynski
1973 - Gary Schwartz
1971 to 1972 - Johann Stoyva
1970 to 1971 - Thomas Mulholland
1969 to 1970  - Barbara Brown,

AAPB Foundation
The AAPB Foundation was formed in 1985 at the urging of then AAPB president, Neal Miller. Miller believed that the organization should encourage the interest and application of work by students to demonstrate the efficacy of biofeedback techniques. Presently, the foundation annually supports travel scholarships to students whose papers have been accepted for presentation at the annual meeting.

The Foundation for Education and Research in Biofeedback and Related Sciences initiated a program aimed at stimulating biofeedback research at its 2009 Board meeting. The board established funding for three grants at $1,000 each. Eligibility is limited to graduate students doing research in biofeedback and related fields. The award is accompanied by a travel scholarship and a waiver of registration to attend the AAPB annual meeting where the results of the research are presented.

References

External links
Association for Applied Psychophysiology and Biofeedback (AAPB)
Biofeedback Certification Institute of America (BCIA)
Biofeedback Foundation of Europe (BFE)
Northeast Regional Biofeedback Society (NRBS)

Biofeedback
Physiology organizations
Mind–body interventions
Devices to alter consciousness
Psychotherapy organizations